Paranerita triangularis is a moth of the subfamily Arctiinae first described by Walter Rothschild in 1909. It is found in Peru and Guyana.

References

Moths described in 1909
Paranerita